Gerd Bohnsack (born 15 February 1939 in Hanover) is a German former football player and manager.

Bohnsack managed SV Arminia Hannover, VfL Osnabrück, VfB Oldenburg and Hannover 96 in the 2. Bundesliga during the 1970s and 1980s.

References 
 
 

1939 births
Living people
Footballers from Hanover
German footballers
Association football midfielders
Hannover 96 players
German football managers
2. Bundesliga managers
SV Arminia Hannover managers
VfL Osnabrück managers
VfB Oldenburg managers
Tennis Borussia Berlin managers
Hannover 96 managers